Alika Milova (born 5 September 2002), known mononymously as Alika, is an Estonian singer of Russian descent from Narva. She is set to represent Estonia in the Eurovision Song Contest 2023 with the song "Bridges".

Musical career
Milova made her name by participating in various singing competitions and television programs in Estonia and abroad since childhood, including The Baltic Voice, New Wave Junior, Kaunas Talent, Bravo Song Contest and Berlin Perle. She rose to prominence in 2021 with her victory at the eighth edition of the Estonian talent show Eesti otsib superstaari, which earned her a record deal with Universal Music Group.

On 1 November 2022, it was announced that she will participate in Eesti Laul 2023 with the song "Bridges". She participated in Semi Final 2 and qualified for the final. On 11 February 2023, Milova performed in the final, where televoting chose her as the winner among the 12 participants and became their national representative at the Eurovision Song Contest 2023 in Liverpool.

Personal life
Milova's sister, Valeria Milova, is a professional dancer and has appeared on the Turkish and Irish versions of Dancing with the Stars.

Discography

Singles 
 2021 – ""
 2022 – ""
 2022 – ""
 2022 – "Bridges"

References 

2002 births
Living people
Estonian singers
People from Narva
21st-century Estonian women singers
21st-century Estonian singers
Estonian people of Russian descent
English-language singers from Estonia
Eurovision Song Contest entrants for Estonia
Eurovision Song Contest entrants of 2023
Universal Music Group artists